The MPG/ESO telescope is a 2.2-metre f/8.0 (17.6-metre) ground-based telescope at the European Southern Observatory (ESO) in La Silla, Chile. It was built by Zeiss and has been operating since 1984. It was on indefinite loan to the European Southern Observatory from the Max Planck Institute for Astronomy (MPIA). In October 2013 it was returned to the MPIA. Telescope time is shared between MPIA and MPE observing programmes, while the operation and maintenance of the telescope are ESO's responsibility.

The telescope hosts three instruments: the 67-million-pixel Wide Field Imager with a field of view as large as the full Moon, which has taken many amazing images of celestial objects; GROND, the Gamma-Ray Burst Optical/Near-Infrared Detector, which chases the afterglows of the most powerful explosions in the universe, known as gamma-ray bursts; and the high-resolution spectrograph, FEROS, used to make detailed studies of stars.

In November 2010 it was used to observe HIP 13044, and marked what was thought to be the first time a planetary system in a stellar stream of extragalactic origin had been detected. However, subsequent analysis in 2014 found no evidence for a planet orbiting the star.

Gallery

See also
 Lists of telescopes

References

External links

European Southern Observatory
Astronomical observatories in Chile